"Baby Sittin' Boogie" is a song written by Johnny Parker and performed by Buzz Clifford.  It reached #4 in Norway, #6 on the Billboard pop chart, #17 on the UK Singles Chart, #27 on the R&B chart, and #28 on the U.S. country chart in 1961.  The song was featured on his 1961 album, Baby Sittin' with Buzz Clifford.

The song was arranged by Tony Piano.

The single ranked #67 on Billboard's Year-End Hot 100 singles of 1961.

Other versions
Sacha Distel released a version of the song in France as a single in 1961 entitled "Le boogie du bébé".
Ralf Bendix released a version of the song as a single in 1961 entitled "Babysitter-Boogie" which reached #1 in Germany.

In media
Clifford's version was featured in Mighty Morphin Power Rangers Season 2 in the episode "The Ninja Encounter: Part 3" in which Comic reliefs Bulk and Skull are looking after a baby boy and attempt to change his diaper. For later airings as well as DVDs and streaming services, it's replaced with the duo's background music due to copyright reasons.

References

1960 songs
1960 singles
1961 singles
Buzz Clifford songs
Columbia Records singles
Fontana Records singles
Philips Records singles
Number-one singles in Germany